The Colorado Pacific Railroad is a shortline railroad operating on 122 miles of former Missouri Pacific Railroad trackage in southeast Colorado. It interchanges with Union Pacific and BNSF at North Avondale Junction near Boone, and with the Kansas and Oklahoma Railroad at Towner. It is sometimes referred to as the Towner Line or the Towner Railway.

History
The line was constructed in the late 1880s by the Missouri Pacific Railroad as part of its mainline between Pueblo and Kansas City. As a condition of the 1982 Missouri Pacific - Union Pacific merger, the Denver & Rio Grande Western got trackage rights over this line. The D&RGW merged with the Southern Pacific in 1992. In 1996, Union Pacific Merged with Southern Pacific, and the line became redundant in UP's system. The Surface Transportation Board approved the abandonment as part of the merger.

The Colorado Department of Transportation purchased the line from UP in 1998 for $10.2 million in hopes of finding a short-line operator to serve farmers and others in small towns along the route. In 2000, CDOT leased the line to the Colorado, Kansas & Pacific Railway. In 2004, the lease was transferred to V&S Railway. V&S, intent on scrapping the line for immediate cash, put factors in place to make a railroad appear no longer viable. They made their freight rates uneconomical so that shippers were guaranteed to lose money.

Soloviev Group Ownership
Real estate magnate Stefan Soloviev's Crossroads Agriculture began operating in the area in 2007. Soloviev became interested in the railroad line, especially when learning about V&S's intention to abandon the line. He decided to purchase the line to facilitate grain transportation at lower costs. Upon discovering Soloviev's intentions, in 2014 V&S began preparing the line to be scrapped by removing tie spikes and anchors. However, they did not have legal authority from the STB to do this. Soloviev asked the STB to force the sale of the railroad as a feeder line. The sale took place in 2016.

Over the following years, rehabilitation took place and railroad operations gradually resumed, with plans to expand service as new infrastructure is completed.

Rolling Stock
The railroad owns two EMD SD40s, painted blue and prominently displaying the Colorado Pacific logo.

References

External links

https://solovievgroup.com/divisions/colorado-pacific-railroad

Colorado railroads